Bhakkar District ,  is a district in the province of Punjab, Pakistan.  The district was created out of parts of Mianwali in 1982, and has the city of Bhakkar as its headquarters. Part of its area consists of a riverine tract along the Indus, called Kaccha, while most of the district area lies in the desolate plain of the Thal Desert. The main languages spoken in the district are Saraiki (79.97%), Punjabi (10.18%), Urdu (7.14%), and Pashto (2.33%).

It is located in the west of the Punjab province, Bhakkar district is bordered by Layyah to its south, Jhang to its south east, Dera Ismail Khan to its west, Khushab to its north east, and Mianwali to its north.

Administration
The district is administratively divided into four Tehsils and 64 Union Councils:

 Bhakkar
 Darya Khan
 Kaloorkot
 Mankera

Khansar Union Council is one of the major Union Councils in Bhakkar. Mari Shah Sakhira Union Council is very close to Bhakkar District boundary.

Demography
At the time of the 2017 census the district had a population of 1,647,852, of which 843,056 were males and 804,669 females. Rural population is 1,388,198 while the urban population is 259,654. The literacy rate was 51.82%. Muslims made up almost the entire population with 99.89%.

At the time of the 2017 census, 79.97% of the population spoke Saraiki, 10.18% Punjabi, 7.14% Urdu and 2.33% Pashto as their first language.

Education
According to the census held in 2017, the literacy rate of Bhakkar is about 55%. There are 19 colleges, and 1300 primary, elementary, secondary, and higher secondary schools.

Notable people 
 Rasheed Akbar Khan Nawani (politician)
 Muhammad Sana Ullah Khan Masti Khel (politician)
 Inamullah Niazi (politician)

See also

References

External links 

 
Districts of Punjab, Pakistan
1981 establishments in Pakistan